Monika Willi (born 29 May 1968), also known as Mona Willi, is an Austrian film editor. She is best known for her collaborations with filmmakers Michael Haneke, Michael Glawogger and Barbara Albert. In 2023, she was nominated for the Academy Award for Best Film Editing for her work on Todd Field's film Tár.

Early life
Monika Willi was born on 29 May 1968 in Innsbruck. She is the sister of Green Party politician , who has served as the mayor of Innsbruck since May 2018.

Career
Willi posthumously realized and edited the material of Michael Glawogger, who died of malaria during the production of an untitled film project in Liberia in 2014. Under the title Untitled, it premiered in the Panorama section at the 67th Berlin International Film Festival in February 2017. Willi created the film using the footage from Glawogger's four and a half months of shooting through the Balkans, Italy and Africa. It also incorporates excerpts from Glawogger's diary. At the 2018 Austrian Film Awards, Untitled received four awards, including Best Documentary and Best Editing.

In 2017, she was inducted into the Academy of Motion Picture Arts and Sciences.

In 2019, for her work on Wolfgang Fischer's Styx, she was awarded an Austrian Film Award in the category Best Editing.

In January 2023, she was nominated for the Academy Award for Best Film Editing for her work on Todd Field's film Tár. In his review of Tár, David Rooney of The Hollywood Reporter wrote, "Editor Monika Willi makes the expansive running time of more than two-and-a-half hours breathe, but also fly by with gripping tension".

Filmography

Film

Television

Awards and nominations

References

External links
 

1968 births
Living people
Austrian film editors
Women film editors
Film people from Innsbruck